While Mortals Sleep is the second Christmas album by English folk musician Kate Rusby, released on 14 November 2011 on Pure Records. Similar to Rusby's previous Christmas release, Sweet Bells (2008), the album features South Yorkshire-based material, and features artwork by Marie Mills.

Track listing
"Cranbrook" - 3:46
"Home" - 3:47
"Kris Kringle" - 4:09
"Little Town of Bethlehem" - 5:33
"Joy to the World" - 3:17
"Holmfirth Anthem" - 4:16
"Seven Good Joys" - 3:48
"Rocking Carol" - 3:51
"Shepherds Arise" - 4:45
"First Tree in the Greenwood" - 5:43
"Diadem" - 4:21
"The Wren" - 3:21

References

Kate Rusby albums
2011 Christmas albums
Christmas albums by English artists
Folk Christmas albums